The year 1834 in architecture involved some significant architectural events and new buildings.

Events 
 October 16 – Burning of Parliament: Much of the Palace of Westminster in London is destroyed by fire. Augustus Pugin is among the witnesses.
 The Institute of British Architects in London, predecessor of the Royal Institute of British Architects, is formed.
 First published scholarly description and drawings of a stave church, painter Johannes Flintoe's essay on Heddal Stave Church in Samlinger til det Norske Folks Sprog og Historie (Christiania).

Buildings and structures

Buildings opened

 August 30 – The Alexander Column, Saint Petersburg, Russia, designed by Auguste de Montferrand, is unveiled.
 October 7 – Birmingham Town Hall in Birmingham, England, designed by Joseph Hansom and Edward Welch, is opened for the start of the Music Festival, already delayed by a year because of lack of funds.

Buildings completed
 De Zwaluw, Hoogeveen, smock mill, Netherlands, built for Lucas Quirinus Robaard and Karsjen Meeuwes Steenbergen.
 Gurgi Mosque, Tripoli, Libya.
 Final reconstruction of the Presidential Palace, Vilnius, Lithuania, by Vasily Stasov.
 Reconstruction of the Narva Triumphal Arch in Saint Petersburg in stone by Vasily Stasov.

Awards 
 Grand Prix de Rome, architecture: Paul-Eugène Lequeux.

Births 
 March 11 – E. W. Pugin, English ecclesiastical architect (d. 1875)
 March 24 – William Morris, English artist, writer and conservationist (d. 1896)
 April 5 – Robert Rowand Anderson, Scottish architect (d. 1921)
 April 7 – Alfred B. Mullett, English-born American architect (d. 1890)

 May 23 – Jānis Frīdrihs Baumanis, Latvian architect (d. 1891)
 August 2 – Frédéric Bartholdi, French sculptor (d. 1904)
 Date unknown – Giorgio Costantino Schinas, Maltese architect and civil engineer (d. 1894)

Deaths 
 September 2 – Thomas Telford, Scottish-born stonemason, architect and civil engineer (b. 1757)
 September 5 – Thomas Lee, English architect (b. 1794)

References 

Architecture
Years in architecture
19th-century architecture